Van der Merwe is a common Afrikaans surname, derived from the Dutch van der Merwen ("from the Merwede"). It was brought to South Africa in 1661 by Dutch people employed by the Dutch East India Company.

The progenitors of the extended clan are Willem Schalk van der Merwe (born in "Broeck", probably Broek, Utrecht near the Merwede) and Elsje Cloete (born Cologne, North Rhine-Westphalia). Married in 1668 in Cape Town, they later farmed for a living in Hout Bay and eventually retired to Drakenstein. Many if not most of the people below, who include 16 rugby players, are their descendants.

People
  (1897–1978), pastor, one the main leaders of the South-African Dutch Reformed Church between 1945 and 1966
Akker van der Merwe (born 1991), South African rugby player
Alan van der Merwe (born 1980), South African racer
Albert van der Merwe (born 1981), South African-born Irish cricketer
Alwyn Van der Merwe (born 1927), South African physicist
André Carl van der Merwe (born 1961), South African novelist
André van der Merwe (born 1967), South African urologist 
André van der Merwe, South African choir conductor
Andries van der Merwe (born 1994), South African sprinter
Bertus van der Merwe (1929–1971), South African rugby player
Cecile van der Merwe (born 1987), South African chess player
 (1921–1985), South African government minister
D. T. H. van der Merwe (born 1986), South African-born Canadian rugby player
Danie van der Merwe (born 1989), South African rugby player
Duhan van der Merwe (born 1995), South African born rugby player who represents Scotland
Edward van der Merwe (1903–1971), South African cricketer
Fanie van der Merwe (born 1986), South African Paralympic athlete
Flip van der Merwe (born 1985), South African rugby player
Flippie van der Merwe (born 1957), South African rugby player
Franco van der Merwe (born 1983), South African rugby player
François van der Merwe (born 1983), South African rugby player
 (1894–1968), South African physician and botanist
Frith van der Merwe (born 1964), South African long-distance athlete
Gert van der Merwe, South African Paralympic athlete
Heinke van der Merwe (born 1985), South African rugby player
Hendrik W. (H.W.) van der Merwe (1929–2001), South African lecturer
Izak van der Merwe (born 1984), South African tennis player
 (1924–1989), Dutch cabaretier and lyricist
Jan van der Merwe (born 1983), South African sprinter
Jan van der Merwe (born 1995), South African rugby union player
Jan H van der Merwe (1922-2016), South African physicist
Johanna van der Merwe (1825–1888), prominent female voortrekker
Johannes van der Merwe (born 1980), Namibian cricketer
 (born 1949), South African writer
Koos van der Merwe, (born 1937), South African politician
Lourens van der Merwe, South African rugby referee
Lowaldo van der Merwe (born 1986), Namibian cricketer
Marcel van der Merwe (born 1990), South African rugby player
Marina van der Merwe, South African-born Canadian field hockey coach
Marissa van der Merwe (born 1978), South African cyclist
Marlice van der Merwe (now Marlice van Vuuren, born 1976), Namibian conservationist
 Morné van der Merwe (1973–2013), South African rugby player
Musetta van der Merwe (known as Musetta Vander, born 1963), South African actress and model
Peter van der Merwe, South African musicologist
Peter van der Merwe (1937–2013), South African cricketer
Peter van de Merwe (1942–2016), Dutch football goalkeeper
Pieter van der Merwe, British maritime historian
Roelof van der Merwe (born 1984), international cricketer from South Africa and Netherlands
 (born 1979), South African rugby player
Sarel van der Merwe (born 1946), South African rally car driver
 (1922–1984), South African politician and surgeon
Schalk van der Merwe (1961–2016), South African tennis player
Schalk van der Merwe (born 1990), South African rugby player
Senan van der Merwe (born 1986), South African rugby player
 (born 1992), South African sprinter
 (born 1939), South African diplomat and politician
Strijdom van der Merwe (born 1961), South African artist
Yulandi van der Merwe (born 1977), South African cricketer

Characters in fiction
 Wikus van de Merwe, protagonist of the film District 9

See also
 Van Der Merwe Miszewski Architects
 SAS Johanna Van der Merwe

References

Surnames
Afrikaans-language surnames
Dutch-language surnames
Surnames of Dutch origin
South African families